Sergeant William Bumgarner (July 12, 1837 – December 24, 1911) was an American soldier who fought in the American Civil War. Bumgarner received the country's highest award for bravery during combat, the Medal of Honor, for his action at Vicksburg, Mississippi on 22 May 1863. He was honored with the award on 10 July 1894.

Biography
Bumgarner was born in Mason County, West Virginia on 12 July 1837. He enlisted into the 4th West Virginia Infantry. He died on 24 December 1911 and his remains are interred at the Mossburg Cemetery in Indiana.

Medal of Honor citation

See also

List of American Civil War Medal of Honor recipients: A–F
Battle of Vicksburg
4th West Virginia Volunteer Infantry Regiment

Notes

References

External links

A Forlorn Hope
Vicksburg Medal of Honor Recipients

1837 births
1911 deaths
People of West Virginia in the American Civil War
Union Army officers
United States Army Medal of Honor recipients
American Civil War recipients of the Medal of Honor
People from Mason County, West Virginia